Leutnant zur See (Lt zS or LZS) is the lowest officer rank in the German Navy. It is grouped as OF1 in NATO, equivalent to an Ensign in the United States Navy, and an Acting Sub-Lieutenant in the British Royal Navy.

The rank was introduced in the German Imperial Navy by renaming the former rank of Sekonde Lieutenant in 1890. In navy context officers of this rank were simply addressed as Herr Leutnant. To distinguish naval officers from officers of the army, the suffix zur See (at sea) was added in official communication, sometimes shortened to z.S. or Lt.z.S. The rank has since been used by the Reichsmarine, the Kriegsmarine and the German Navy. In the Volksmarine the rank was originally used in the same way until the suffix zur See was dropped.

See also
 Ranks of the German Bundeswehr
 Rank insignia of the German Bundeswehr
 Ranks and insignia of officers of NATO navies

References

Naval ranks of Germany